Lucile (also known as Lucille) is an unincorporated community in Wirt County, West Virginia.

References

Unincorporated communities in Wirt County, West Virginia
Unincorporated communities in West Virginia